Cocamidopropyl hydroxysultaine (CAHS) is a synthetic amphoteric surfactant from the hydroxysultaine group. It is found in personal care products (soaps, shampoos, lotions etc.). It has uses as a foam booster, viscosity builder, and an antistatic agent.

See also 
 Cocamidopropyl betaine

References

External links 
 Household Products Database: Chemical Information

Zwitterionic surfactants
Antiseptics
Cosmetics chemicals
Antistatic agents
Quaternary ammonium compounds